We've Got Tonight is the fourteenth studio album by Kenny Rogers, released in 1983. It is also his last with Liberty Records before signing with  RCA Records.

Overview
The title cut, a duet with Sheena Easton, was the debut single and became one of Rogers' signature hits, soaring to No. 1 on the country charts and No. 2 on the Adult Contemporary chart, reaching No. 6 on the Hot 100 chart. There were two other singles: "All My Life", which peaked at No. 13 on the country charts, though it fared at No. 3 in Canada, and "Scarlet Fever", which is lesser-known but still reached No. 5 and No. 4 in the US. and Canada, respectively.

The title of the album comes from its signature track, written by Bob Seger and originating from his album, Stranger in Town. By comparison with Rogers' version, Seger's only reached No. 13 on the Hot 100, making Rogers' version a higher-seller (at the time), five years after it was written.

One song on the album that never became a single but still became one of Rogers' signature songs is the powerful "You Are So Beautiful". This track was placed at the end of the album as a tribute to his legions of female fans, and stands today as one of the songs that Kenny is known for. The song was written by Billy Preston and Bruce Fisher and originally appears on the 1974 Preston album The Kids and Me.

Lionel Richie, who by now had been contributing a reasonable number of songs to Rogers, submitted the track "How Long" to this album.

The album hit No. 3 on the country chart and No. 18 on the main Billboard album chart.  It attained Platinum status in both the United States and Canada.

Track listing

Personnel 

 Kenny Rogers – lead vocals,  backing vocals (4, 5)
 David Foster – keyboards (1, 6), backing vocals (6)
 John Hobbs – keyboards (2, 5, 10)
 Randy Goodrum – keyboards (4), backing vocals (4)
 Shane Keister – keyboards (4)
 Robbie Buchanan – synthesizers (7, 9)
 Michael Lang – keyboards (7, 9)
 Clarence McDonald – keyboards (7, 9)
 Reginald "Sonny" Burke –keyboards (8)
 Marty Walsh – guitar (1)
 Timothy May – guitar (2, 7, 9)
 Fred Tackett – guitar (2, 10)
 Kin Vassy – guitar (2, 3), backing vocals (2, 3, 5, 7, 8, 10)
 Billy Joe Walker Jr. – guitar (3)
 Richie Zito – guitar (3, 5)
 Jon Goin – guitar (4)
 Steve Lukather – guitar (6)
  Carlos Rios – guitar (7, 9)
 Paul Jackson Jr. – guitar (8, 9)
 David T. Walker – guitar (8)
 Nathan East – bass (1, 8)
 Joe Chemay – bass (2, 5, 6, 7, 9), backing vocals (2, 3, 5, 6)
 Trey Thompson – bass (3)
 Jack Williams – bass (4)
 Emory Gordy Jr. – bass (10)
 Mike Baird – drums (1, 6)
 Paul Leim – drums (2, 5, 7, 9, 10), percussion (2)
 Ress Williams – drums (3)
 Kenny Malone – drums (4)
 Leon "Ndugu" Chancler – drums (8)
 Gary Herbig – oboe (10)
 Jeremy Lubbock – string arrangements and conductor (1, 6)
 Bergen White – string arrangements (4)
 Sheldon Kurland – strings (4)
 Sheena Easton – lead vocals (1)
 Terry Williams – backing vocals (2-8, 10), guitar (3)
 Dorothy Newton – backing vocals (5)
 Juanice Charmaine – backing vocals (7, 8)
 Lionel Richie – backing vocals (7)
 Cindy Fee – backing vocals (10)

Production 
 Producers – Kenny Rogers (Tracks 1, 2, 3, 5, 6, 8, 9 & 10); David Foster (Tracks 1 & 6); Brent Maher (Track 4); Randy Goodrum (Track 4); James Carmichael (Track 7, 8 & 9); Lionel Richie (Tracks 7 & 8).
 Engineers – Humberto Gatica (Tracks 1, 6 & 9); Al Schmitt (Tracks 1, 6, 8, 9 & 10); Reggie Dozier (Tracks 2, 3, 5, 8 & 10); Stephen Schmitt (Track 3); Brent Maher (Track 4); Calvin Harris (Tracks 7 & 9); Bob Bullock (Track 9).
 Second Engineer – Stephen Schmitt (Tracks 1, 4, 5 & 10); Larry Ferguson (Track 2).
 Mixing – Humberto Gatica (Track 1); Bob Bullock (Track 2); Al Schmitt (Track 3); Reggie Dozier (Track 5); Calvin Harris (Track 7).
 Tracks 1, 2, 3 & 5-10 recorded at Lion Share Recording (Los Angeles, CA); Track 4 recorded at Creative Workshop (Nashville, TN); Tracks 7 & 9 recorded at Hitsville Studios (Los Angeles, CA).
 Strings on Tracks 1 & 6 recorded at Ocean Way Recording (Los Angeles, CA).
 Tracks 1, 2, 3, 5, 6, 8 & 10 mixed at Lion Share Recording; Track 4 mixed at Creative Workshop; Tracks 7 & 9 mixed at Hitsville Studios.
 Mastered by Doug Sax at The Mastering Lab (Los Angeles, CA).
 Art Direction – Henry Marquez and Roy R. Guzman
 Design – Roy R. Guzman
 Photography – Matthew Rolston
 Management – Ken Kragen

Charts

Weekly charts

Year-end charts

References

[ We've Got Tonight album page at Allmusic]

Kenny Rogers albums
1983 albums
Albums produced by David Foster
Albums produced by Brent Maher
Albums produced by Lionel Richie
Liberty Records albums